Keep It in the Family is a British game show that aired on ITV from 26 October 2014 to 19 December 2015 and was hosted by Bradley Walsh.

Format
Two families of four participate in a series of rounds for the chance to win prizes, including a family holiday. The children take the lead in the show rather than the parents. The rounds feature family members nominated for routines, dressing up as TV characters and trying to guess phrases based on clues given by grandmothers. Celebrities appear in the show and may be dropped down a trapdoor depending on the prizes chosen by the contestants; these celebrities include those known for The X Factor, Coronation Street, and Britain's Got Talent.

Transmissions

Series

Special

Reception
Walsh described the show as "the most fun [he has] ever had on TV". The Guardian said that although the show "shouldn't work", it was well-suited to the presenter, calling Walsh "a virtuoso of amiable schtick".

References

External links

2014 British television series debuts
2015 British television series endings
English-language television shows
ITV game shows
Television series by ITV Studios
Television shows shot at BBC Elstree Centre